Eyre Sealy is a Barbadian professional football manager.

Career
In 1998 and since January 2007 until June 2008 he coached the Barbados national football team.

References

External links
Profile at Soccerway.com
Profile at Soccerpunter.com

Year of birth missing (living people)
Living people
Barbadian football managers
Barbados national football team managers
Place of birth missing (living people)